The Élie Cartan Prize (Prix Élie Cartan) is awarded every three years by the Institut de France, Academie des Sciences, Fondation Élie Cartan, to recognize a mathematician who has introduced new ideas or solved a difficult problem. The prize, named for mathematician Élie Cartan, was established in 1980 and carries a monetary award.

Recipients 
The recipients of the Élie Cartan Prize are:

 1981: Dennis P. Sullivan 
 1984: Mikhael Gromov
 1987: Johannes Sjöstrand 
 1990: Jean Bourgain 
 1993: Clifford H. Taubes 
 1996: Don Zagier 
 1999: Laurent Clozel 
 2002: Jean-Benoît Bost 
 2006: Emmanuel Ullmo 
 2009: Raphaël Rouquier 
 2012: Francis Brown 
 2015: Anna Erschler
 2018: Vincent Pilloni

See also

 List of mathematics awards

References 

Mathematics awards